The Hali Dam is a gravity dam on Wadi Hali about  east of Keyad in Makkah Province of southwestern Saudi Arabia. The dam has many purposes to include flood control, irrigation, municipal water supply and groundwater recharge. The dam was constructed between 2003 and 2009. It is owned and operated by the Ministry of Water and Electricity.

References

Dams completed in 2009
Dams in Saudi Arabia
Mecca Province
Gravity dams
2009 establishments in Saudi Arabia